The 1956 Edmonton Eskimos finished in 1st place in the Western Interprovincial Football Union with an 11–5 record and won the 44th Grey Cup, completing the first Grey Cup three-peat in the modern era.

Pre-season

Schedule

Regular season

Season Standings

Season schedule

Playoffs

Grey Cup

References

Edmonton Elks seasons
Grey Cup championship seasons
N. J. Taylor Trophy championship seasons
1956 Canadian football season by team